Hwasun O clan was one of the Korean clans. Their Bon-gwan was in Hwasun County, South Jeolla Province. According to the research in 2000, the number of Hwasun O clan was 3032. Their founder was O Won. O Won was a 3rd son of  who was a founder of Boseong O clan.  came over from China to Silla during Jijeung of Silla’s reign in Silla dynasty.

See also 
 Korean clan names of foreign origin

References

External links 
 

 
Korean clan names of Chinese origin